Megan Malcom-Morgan (born 1990, Trinidad, Colorado) is a curator in Belen, New Mexico.  She taught American Literature at University of New Mexico, and worked as the executive director of Through the Flower, a nonprofit corporation founded by feminist artist Judy Chicago in 1977.

Career
Megan Malcom-Morgan was the executive director of Through the Flower from August 2021 through January 2023. In that time, she curated and assisted in the curation of exhibitions alongside Judy Chicago and Nancy Youdelman, most notably Wo/Manhouse in 2022.

She supported and operated Through the Flower Art Space, a gallery highlighting the achievements of women in art, including the many works of Judy Chicago from October 2018 to January 2023.

Wo/Manhouse 
Wo/Manhouse was a contemporary re-envisioning of the original Womanhouse in a mid-century home in Belen, New Mexico, open from June 2022 to October 2022. Nineteen New Mexico artists from across the gender spectrum, age groups, art media, and different stages of their careers transformed rooms and closets into an exploration of their relationship with the home, as a place of comfort but also conflict, with power dynamics, abuse, parenting issues, gender identity, cultural prejudice, socioeconomic constraints, the modern family, and other themes related to domesticity.

The International Honor Quilt, a collective feminist art project initiated in 1980 by Judy Chicago as a companion piece to The Dinner Party, was also on display at Wo/Manhouse.

Selected exhibitions

New Beginning(s) New Space(s), Silver-Bar Studios, Belen, New Mexico, 2023
Lessons for Today: Revisiting The Dinner Party, Belen, New Mexico, project of Through the Flower, 2022
Wo/Manhouse, Belen, New Mexico, project of Through the Flower under the direction of Judy Chicago reimagining Womanhouse on its 50th anniversary, 2022
Childbirth in America, Belen, New Mexico, project of Through the Flower, 2021–2022

See also
 Judy Chicago
 Nancy Youdelman
 Womanhouse
 International Honor Quilt

Further reading
Chicago, Judy. From Womanhouse to Wo/Manhouse. Through the Flower (2022).

References

1990 births
Living people
People from Trinidad, Colorado
American curators